Martin L. Puryear (born May 23, 1941) is an American artist known for his devotion to traditional craft. Working in wood and bronze, among other media, his reductive technique and meditative approach challenge the physical and poetic boundaries of his materials. The artist's Martin Puryear: Liberty/Libertà exhibition represented the United States at the 2019 Venice Biennale.

Life

Born in 1941 in Washington, D.C., Martin Puryear began exploring traditional craft methods in his youth, making tools, boats, musical instruments, and furniture. After receiving a BA in Fine Art from the Catholic University of America in 1963, Puryear spent two years as a Peace Corps volunteer in Sierra Leone where he learned local woodworking techniques. From 1966–1968, he studied at the Royal Swedish Academy of Arts in Stockholm, returning to the United States afterward to enroll in the graduate program for sculpture at Yale University. Although he discovered Minimalism at a formative period in his development, Puryear would ultimately reject its impersonality and formalism.

After earning his MFA from Yale, Puryear began teaching at Fisk University in Nashville and University of Maryland in College Park. In 1977, following a devastating fire in his Brooklyn studio, Puryear had a solo show at the Corcoran Gallery of Art in Washington. Shortly after he moved to Chicago.

In both 1979 and 1981, and again in 1989, his work was included in the Whitney Biennial at the Whitney Museum of American Art in New York City. He travelled to Japan in 1982 through a Guggenheim Memorial Foundation Fellowship where he investigated architecture and garden design. In 1989, he was awarded the MacArthur Foundation Fellowship. He received the Gold Medal in Sculpture by the American Academy of Arts and Letters in 2007, and was recently awarded the National Medal of Arts.

Puryear has lived in New York's Hudson Valley since 1990 where he works in a studio of his own construction. An African-American, he does not speak frequently about his identity but has expressed appreciation for the life of James Beckwourth.

Artwork (selection)
The artwork of Martin Puryear is a product of visibly complex craft construction and manipulation of pure material; its forms are combinations of the organic and the geometric. His process can be described as reductive, seeking to bring work and material close to its original state and creating rationality in each work derived from the maker and act of making. This is what Puryear calls "inevitability", or a "fullness of being within limits" that defines function.

Often associated with both Minimalism and Formalist sculpture, Puryear rejects that his work is ever non-referential or objective. The pure and direct imagistic forms born from his use of traditional craft are allusive and poetic, as well as deeply personal. Visually, they encounter the history of objects and the history of their making, suggesting public and private narratives including those of the artist, race, ritual, and identity.

His work is widely exhibited and collected both in the United States and internationally. Included amongst Puryear's public works is his large-scale composition Ark (1988) which was designed for York College and can be viewed presently on the school's campus in Queens, New York. Puryear has also created several permanent outdoor works, such as Bodark Arc (1982) and Pavilion in the Trees (1993), and collaborated with landscape architects on the design of public spaces. A 30-year survey, organized by the Museum of Modern Art, New York and which traveled to the National Gallery of Art, the San Francisco Museum of Modern Art, and the Modern Art Museum of Fort Worth, included installations of some of the artist's largest works, notably the dramatically foreshortened 36-foot Ladder for Booker T. Washington (1996) made from a single, split sapling ash tree.

Bask, 1976 
Bask rests low on the floor in black, made of staved pine wood tapered at each end and swelling gently at the center. The subtle curvature of the work is achieved through the use of a ship making technique called strip planking once used to build the hulls of ships. Geometric in its construction of lines and arcs, it demonstrates well the influence of Minimalism in the early work of Martin Puryear.

Ark, 1988 
Martin Puryear's 36 foot tall and 70 foot long copper tubing installation, Ark, was constructed in 1987 and installed on the campus of York College in 1988 where it can be viewed to this day. Ark was commissioned by the college as a result of New York City's Percent for Art law. York approached Puryear in 1981 and his proposal for Ark was submitted in 1985. The armature made of copper tubing consists of looping and intertwined oval and circular shapes, swelling slightly at the center and sagging at the bottom, evoking the skeletal framework of a ship's hull.

Puryear designed Ark specifically for the location in which it hangs, suspended from rafters by cables in the Academic Core Building. The piece was mounted in the space between the glass walls of the library and the second and third floor balconies. The installation floats unobtrusively in the soft, natural light that filters through the Academic Core Mall and reflects imagery consistent with recurring motifs of Puryear's work such as ships and embryonic forms which are visible in pieces such as, Bask (1976) in which both the shape and construction of ships is referenced by the piece's form and the technique used to build it.

The Load, 2012 
Lacking any means of conveyance, the full-size two-wheeled cart in The Load sits poised as if ready to move at a moment's notice, with its twelve-foot harness pole parallel to the ground resting on a center prop. Mounted atop the axle of the cart is a gridded wooden box that encages a white sphere fitted with a glass aperture. The glass aperture faces the rear of the cart, an accessible portal through which a viewer can glimpse the complex interior structure of the wooden sphere.

The cart is an immediately recognizable object, although from no particular time or place in history. Two-wheeled carts have been in use since the second millennium BCE, and are common in cultures worldwide, making it both culturally and temporally ambiguous. In futuristic white, the sphere juxtaposes the aged wood of the cart.

The Load revisits the wheel as an object with functional and symbolic meanings in the work of Puryear, who often deals with escapism, flight, and mobility.

Slavery Memorial, 2014

References

External links
Roberta Smith's article in the NYT, Nov. 2, 2007
 Martin Puryear at Matthew Marks Gallery, New York.
David Levi-Strauss interview with Martin Puryear from Brooklyn Rail, November 2007
Puryear's Guggenheim Museum Biography
Martin Puryear at McKee Gallery Martin Puryear at McKee Gallery, New York
Martin Puryear retrospective at the San Francisco Museum of Modern Art, 2008–2009

1941 births
Living people
Yale School of Art alumni
Catholic University of America alumni
20th-century American sculptors
20th-century American male artists
21st-century American sculptors
21st-century American male artists
American male sculptors
Members of the American Academy of Arts and Letters
Postmodern artists
MacArthur Fellows
Peace Corps volunteers
Artists from Washington, D.C.
United States National Medal of Arts recipients
20th-century American printmakers
African-American contemporary artists
American contemporary artists
African-American sculptors
African-American printmakers
20th-century African-American artists
21st-century African-American artists